Malta was built in 1802 at Minorca for Spanish owners, probably under another name. As Malta she enters British records in 1807. She traded with the Mediterranean and then more widely until 1818 when she was wrecked at the Cape of Good Hope (CGH).

Career
Malta first appeared in Lloyd's Register (LR) in 1807.

Fate
Malta, Lindsay, master, was wrecked on 7 March 1818 outside Table Bay on her way from London. About two-thirds of the cargo was saved.

Citations and references
Citations

References
 

1802 ships
Ships built in Spain
Age of Sail merchant ships of England
Maritime incidents in 1818